Geffrey "Geff" Francis (born 1964), best known as Geff Francis, is a British actor who portrayed Lynford, a hoodlum, in the 1988 drama film For Queen and Country. In 1986 he appeared as the title character in Channel Four's Zastrozzi, A Romance and in a minor role in The Singing Detective. In the popular Peckham-set comedy Desmond's he played the title character's eldest son (Michael) (Channel Four, 1989–94), before moving on to the spin-off series Porkpie (1995–96).

He has since become a regular character actor on British television. He portrayed the Metropolitan Police desk sergeant Viv James in the 2008-10 TV series Ashes to Ashes. He also appeared in "The Bells of Saint John", a 2013 episode of Doctor Who.

References

External links

 Geff Francis on "Getting Into Acting: Then and Now", Creative Choices. YouTube video.

Living people
Black British male actors
1964 births
British male television actors
British male film actors
English people of Nigerian descent